Richard Walton was a professional rugby league footballer who played in the 1920s, 1930s and 1940s. He played at club level for Castleford (Heritage №).

Playing career

County League appearances
Richard Walton played in Castleford's victories in the Yorkshire County League during the 1932–33 season, and 1938–39 season.

References

External links
Search for "Walton" at rugbyleagueproject.org
Dick Walton Memory Box Search at archive.castigersheritage.com

Castleford Tigers players
English rugby league players
Place of birth missing
Place of death missing
Year of birth missing
Year of death missing